Wiener is a lunar impact crater that lies on the Moon's far side. It is located just to the southwest of the larger crater Campbell. To the southwest of Wiener is the heavily worn Kurchatov. To the east along the rim of Campbell is Von Neumann. The smaller crater Pawsey lies to the north-northwest, and is partly overlain by the outer rampart of Wiener.

The northwestern half of the crater rim is well-formed, with some slumping and terraces along the inner walls. There is an outward protrusion in the rim along the northern side where the crater borders along Pawsey. The southern part of the crater is more irregular, with a wider, uneven inner wall and a poorly defined rim edge. The rim overlies about half of the heavily worn satellite crater Wiener K along the south-southeast. The smaller satellite crater Wiener Q lies along the southwestern rim, and the relatively fresh and polygon-shaped Wiener F is attached to the eastern rim.

Within the crater, much of the interior floor is relatively level, with a clump of small ridges forming a central peak structure near the midpoint. There is a small craterlet to the east-northeast of these ridges, and there are several small craterlets near the southwestern inner wall.

Satellite craters
By convention these features are identified on lunar maps by placing the letter on the side of the crater midpoint that is closest to Wiener.

References
 Norbert Wiener autobiography - mentions that the lunar feature was named in his honor.

 
 
 
 
 
 
 
 
 
 
 
 

Impact craters on the Moon